The Sun Is Far Away ( / ) is a 1953 Yugoslav war film directed by Radoš Novaković and starring Branko Pleša, Rade Marković and Dragomir Felba. It is a Partisan film, the dominant genre in immediate post-war Yugoslav cinema. During the Second World War, a group of Yugoslav Partisans battle against occupying Bulgarian and German forces.

Cast
 Branko Pleša as Pavle  
 Rade Marković as Uča  
 Dragomir Felba as Gvozden  
 Jozo Laurenčić as Jefta  
 Marko Todorovic as Žarki  
 Olga Brajević as Bojana  
 Janez Vrhovec as Nikola  
 Rastislav Jović as Vuksan  
 Rahela Ferari as Nana  
 Slobodan Stanković as Mališa  
 Uros Kravljaca as Partizan
 Miroslav Čangalović as a solo singer

References

Bibliography 
 Liehm, Mira & Liehm, Antonín J. The Most Important Art: Eastern European Film After 1945. University of California Press, 1977.

External links 
 

1953 films
1953 war films
Yugoslav war films
Serbo-Croatian-language films
War films set in Partisan Yugoslavia
Yugoslav black-and-white films
Yugoslav World War II films